A herringbone stitch is a needlework stitch used in embroidery, knitting and crochet. It is so named as it resembles the bones extending from the spine of a herring fish. In knitting, it is a stitch that creates a fabric pattern closely resembling a herringbone pattern, or herringbone cloth.

A knitted herringbone stitch creates a firm fabric "similar to a woven in appearance and elasticity". A heavyweight fabric can be made with variations of the herringbone stitch, such as the herringbone twist stitch, which can be worked in either one or two colours; both versions are suitable for experienced knitters.

Cultural symbolism
The herringbone stitch is used as one of the symbolic motifs in the traditional knitted Aran jumper, or "fisherman's sweater"; specifically, the tradition as it exists in the Channel Islands of Guernsey, Jersey and Filey. The herringbone pattern represents the "fisherman's catch and thus for success in one's career".

See also
Basic knitted fabrics
List of knitting stitches

References

Knitting
Embroidery stitches